Hindon was a parliamentary borough consisting of the village of Hindon in Wiltshire, which elected two Members of Parliament (MPs) to the House of Commons from 1448 until 1832, when the borough was abolished by the Great Reform Act. It was one of the most notoriously corrupt of the rotten boroughs, and bills to disfranchise Hindon were debated in Parliament on two occasions before its eventual abolition.

History
Hindon was a small market town, and may have been of at least minor importance at the time it was first represented in Parliament, during the reign of Henry VI. However, the town was destroyed by a disastrous fire in 1754, and over the same period its trade went into severe decline. By 1831, the population of the borough was only 921, and the borough and town contained 185 houses.

Franchise and influences
Hindon was an example of the class of constituencies known as potwalloper boroughs, the right to vote being exercised by every householder, a household being notionally defined as any dwelling place with a separate hearth capable of heating a pot – this meant in effect that the majority of the male population could vote. The precise regulations in these constituencies varied, but in Hindon the franchise was defined by a House of Commons ruling of 1728 as resting with all inhabitant householders who were parishioners of Hindon and not receiving alms. At the final contested election, that of 1831, it was estimated that these amounted to 170 eligible voters, and 112 actually voted. The local magnates were generally recognised as "patrons" of the borough, and had considerable influence over the choice of MPs; however, Hindon's voters were amenable only at a price, and were frequently prepared to sell the borough's seats to the highest bidder should rival candidates present themselves. In the late 17th century, the Howe family were pre-eminent, and were joined by the Calthorpes who were Lords of the Manor; both frequently chose to keep the seats for themselves or for a family member. The Howe influence faded in the early 18th century, and from 1745 Lord Calthorpe was effectively joined as patron by William Beckford, the wealthy Jamaica planter and London alderman who in that year bought nearby Fonthill Abbey.

John Story
One of Hindon's most remarkable members was John Story, Regius Professor of Civil Law at the University of Oxford. Elected at Hindon in 1547, he gained notoriety by his opposition to the Act of Uniformity in 1548. After he had called out "Woe unto thee, O land, when thy king is a child," Story was imprisoned on the orders of the House of Commons, but was soon released and fled to the Seventeen Provinces. The reign of Queen Mary I from 1553 to 1558 brought him back into public life and he again became a member of parliament, but after Mary's death he opposed the Act of Supremacy of 1559, was imprisoned again, escaped, was recaptured, fled again to the Low Countries, where he became a subject of King Philip II of Spain, was kidnapped by agents of Queen Elizabeth I, was imprisoned in the Tower of London, where he was tortured, and finally in 1571 was hanged, drawn and quartered. He was beatified by Pope Leo XIII in 1886.

Story's successor as Regius Professor of Civil Law at Oxford, William Aubrey, was elected a member for Hindon in 1559.

History of bribery
With an electorate as large as Hindon's, usually amounting to a couple of hundred voters, the hold of the patrons was precarious at the best of times, but was weakened still further when they were competing with each other in the hope of nominating both MPs. An early example of such rivalry was the election of 1697, when Reynolds Calthorpe petitioned to overturn his defeat by Colonel Henry Lee on the grounds of the "undue practices of one Sir James How, who pretended to stand, and spent a great deal of money in treats; but at the time of the election set up Col. Lee, whom the bailiff hath returned." Calthorpe later withdrew his petition and was shortly afterwards elected together with Howe, but it was then the turn of their two defeated opponents, Robert Hyde and George Morley, to bring a petition complaining of "several indirect and unlawful practices at and before the election".

First escape from disfranchisement, 1702
No report of the outcome of the 1698 petition is recorded, so it also may well have been withdrawn. It should be understood that the resolution of petitions at this period was frequently conducted on an entirely partisan basis, the outcome being dependent on which side could command a majority in the Commons rather than on the merits of the case, so that the failure to achieve a favourable verdict cannot be taken to indicate that the complaint was unjustified. Equally, accusations were sometimes made on slender grounds, and the frequency of petitions in itself is no evidence of endemic corruption.

The next developments in Hindon, however, were almost without parallel. At the election of 1701, the candidates once more were Sir James Howe, Reynolds Calthorpe and George Morley. According to the result as declared by the bailiff (the local official who acted as ex officio returning officer), Morley was defeated, beaten into third place by Calthorpe by 70 votes to 62. Morley petitioned against Calthorpe's election, as did some of the voters, complaining that the votes of some of Calthorpe's supporters should not have been accepted since they did not pay scot and lot.  (This was a necessary condition for the franchise in many other boroughs.) After consideration, the committee agreed with Calthorpe that the right to vote in Hindon was not tied to payment of scot and lot, and therefore that the petition was not justified on those grounds.

Then, however, they began to look into the accusations of bribery. A number of witnesses stated that voters had been paid twenty shillings each to vote for Calthorpe, including a number who admitted that they themselves had received such a sum. But, unfortunately for Morley, witnesses were also produced who said they had accepted even larger sums to vote for him. The committee's report to the Commons recommended that neither Calthorpe nor Morley should be accepted as duly elected. However, the House voted down the motion against Morley and he was therefore able to take his seat as an MP.

But the matter was not closed. The following year the accusations were renewed, and the Commons voted that Morley should defend himself in the House against the accusation of bribery during his election. After his accuser, Thomas Jervoise, named seven agents who had assisted Morley in his corrupt practices and a petition against Morley from the unbribed voters of Hindon was presented, another vote was taken and this time the majority was in favour of invalidating Morley's election. However, they now went much further, proposing a bill to disfranchise Hindon altogether. This was not quite unprecedented (a similar measure had been proposed, unsuccessfully, for Stockbridge in 1689), but no such threat had ever been put into effect. In committee, the bill was amended so that rather than abolishing the borough outright it should be "thrown into the hundred" – that is, the boundaries of the borough would be extended to take in the whole of the neighbouring hundred of Downton, which would have abolished the borough in all but name, turning it into a much larger constituency where the majority of votes were cast on the land-owning franchise used in the counties. In this form the bill passed the Commons; but the House of Lords voted against it, so it could not become law. (Ironically, the man elected to fill the vacant seat after this reprieve was Thomas Jervoise.)

The election of "General Gold", 1774
Following this narrow escape, Hindon continued in its corrupt routine, candidates needing to spend considerable sums to secure election. For example, the accounts of Prime Minister Newcastle, detailed by Namier, show £313 11s was spent on backing the government candidate in the Hindon by-election of 1756, William Mabbott, even though the contest was eventually not carried to a poll. Mabbott was apparently prepared to put up another £1000 of his own money if necessary.

In the second half of the 18th century, however, the political climate once more began to turn against open corruption, with Hindon's co-patron William Beckford (who sat as MP for the City of London) being one of the leading spirits in the reform movement. The Hindon election of 1774, when little attempt seems to have been made to conceal the scale of the bribery, was among the most serious cases to come to light, and one of only two where the House of Commons itself voted to prosecute the miscreants (rather than leaving the matter to the normal legal processes).

Richard Smith, a local man who had made a fortune in India and was prepared to spend high to get into Parliament, began his campaign anonymously, a local parson distributing five guineas a man to voters to persuade them to support "General Gold". Another candidate, the radical Thomas Brand Hollis, also appeared to challenge the Beckford and Calthorpe interest, while William Thomas Beckford, eccentric son of the original purchaser of Fonthill, and James Calthorpe were the family candidates. By polling day, Smith, Brand Hollis and Calthorpe had each distributed 15 guineas a head; Beckford had given promises only (though that, of course, was just as illegal as actually paying out money).

After Smith and Brand Hollis topped the poll, Beckford and Calthorpe petitioned against the result. The committee declared the election void, and recommended that all four candidates should be prosecuted for bribery; the House accepted the committee's report, and ordered that the Attorney General should prosecute and that no writ should be issued for a new election, so the borough's representation was suspended. Furthermore, a bill was introduced which would have disfranchised 190 of Hindon's 210 voters (listed by name), and thrown the borough into the hundred. This was no longer unthinkable: the same punishment had been visited on the Sussex borough of New Shoreham for corruption three years earlier, and in the following decade was applied in Wiltshire to remedy the misdemeanours of Cricklade. In this case, however, the proposal met considerable opposition and was eventually dropped, so Hindon survived again and a writ for a new election was issued.

At the new by-election, five candidates were nominated, and Smith was once again victorious together with Henry Dawkins; but, on petition, Smith was unseated once more. In the meanwhile, the bribery prosecution had proceeded, and both Smith and Brand Hollis had been convicted at Salisbury assizes, though Beckford and Calthorpe had been acquitted. Sentencing had been postponed, but a month after the second election both the offenders were fined £500 and jailed for six months.

Abolition
Hindon was abolished as a constituency by the Great Reform Act of 1832, after which Hindon became part of the South Wiltshire county division for subsequent elections.

Members of Parliament

1448–1640

1640–1832

Notes

References 
Robert Beatson, A Chronological Register of Both Houses of Parliament (London: Longman, Hurst, Res & Orme, 1807) 
D. Brunton & D. H. Pennington, Members of the Long Parliament (London: George Allen & Unwin, 1954)
 John Cannon, Parliamentary Reform 1640–1832 (Cambridge: Cambridge University Press, 1972)
Cobbett's Parliamentary history of England, from the Norman Conquest in 1066 to the year 1803 (London: Thomas Hansard, 1808) 
 T. H. B. Oldfield, The Representative History of Great Britain and Ireland (London: Baldwin, Cradock & Joy, 1816)
 J Holladay Philbin, Parliamentary Representation 1832 – England and Wales (New Haven: Yale University Press, 1965)
Henry Stooks Smith, The Parliaments of England from 1715 to 1847 (2nd edition, edited by FWS Craig – Chichester: Parliamentary Reference Publications, 1973)
 Robert Walcott, English Politics in the Early Eighteenth Century (Oxford: Oxford University Press, 1956)

Parliamentary constituencies in Wiltshire (historic)
1448 establishments in England
Constituencies of the Parliament of the United Kingdom disestablished in 1832
Rotten boroughs
Hindon, Wiltshire